List of Romanian films of 2016.

List 

Source: IMDb  Cinemagia

 6.9 on the Richter Scale, Comedy by Nae Caranfil, with Maria Simona Arsu, Laurențiu Bănescu, Radu  Bânzaru, Alina Berzunteanu
 Ilegitim, Drama by Adrian Sitaru
 La drum cu tata, Comedy by Anca Miruna Lăzărescu
 Minte-mă frumos în Centrul Vechi, Comedy by 
 Camera obscură, Documentary by Gheorghe Preda

See also
2016 in Romania
List of 2016 box office number-one films in Romania

References

External links

Romanian
Films
2016